Hasan Kusej (also Romanized as Ḩasan Kūsej, Hasan Koosej, and Ḩasan Kūsaj) is a village in Haram Rud-e Sofla Rural District, Samen District, Malayer County, Hamadan Province, Iran. At the 2006 census, its population was 117, in 32 families.

References 

Populated places in Malayer County